Opera House Station (Vietnamese: Ga Nhà hát Thành phố) is a future underground Ho Chi Minh City Metro station on Line 1. Built in front of the Municipal Theatre of Ho Chi Minh City, the station opened to public viewing in April 2020. It is expected to be completed in by the end of 2023 before public operations begin in early 2024.

References

Ho Chi Minh City Metro stations
Proposed buildings and structures in Vietnam
Railway stations scheduled to open in 2024